Gargoyleosaurus (meaning "gargoyle lizard") is one of the earliest ankylosaurs known from reasonably complete fossil remains. The holotype was discovered in 1995 at the Bone Cabin Quarry West locality, in Albany County, Wyoming in exposures of the Upper Jurassic (Kimmeridgian to Tithonian stages) Morrison Formation.

The type species, G. parkpinorum (originally G. parkpini) was described by Ken Carpenter et al. in 1998. A mounted skeletal reconstruction of Gargoyleosaurus parkpinorum can be seen at the Denver Museum of Nature and Science and, alongside a couple skeletons of baby Stegosaurus, has been on display there since around 2002. Gargoyleosaurus was present in stratigraphic zone 2 of the Morrison Formation.

Discovery

The holotype specimen of Gargoyleosaurus parkpinorum was collected by Western Paleontology Labs in 1995 and is currently held in the collections of the Denver Museum of Nature and Science, Denver, Colorado. Besides the holotype, two other partial skeletons are known (although not yet described). The holotype consists of most of the skull and a partial postcranial skeleton. The specimen was originally described as Gargoyleosaurus parkpini by Carpenter, Miles and Cloward in 1998, then renamed G. parkpinorum by Carpenter et al. in 2001, in accordance with ICZN art. 31.1.2A.

Description
Much of the skull and skeleton has been recovered, and the taxon displays cranial sculpturing, including pronounced deltoid quadratojugal and squamosal bosses. The taxon is further characterized by a narrow rostrum (in dorsal view), the presence of seven conical teeth in each premaxilla, an incomplete osseous nasal septum, a linearly arranged nasal cavity, the absence of an osseus secondary palate, and, as regards osteoderms, two sets of co-ossified cervical plates and a number of elongate conical spines. A very unusual feature is the sagittal (midline) osteoderm on the first set of cervical plates; in most other ankylosaurs, these osteoderms are bilateral, i.e. paired with one on each side of the midline.

Classification

Vickaryous et al. (2004) place Gargoyleosaurus parkpinorum within the family Ankylosauridae of the Ankylosauria and are in agreement with most previous phylogenetic hypotheses, which place the genus as the sister group to all other ankylosaurids (i.e., members of the Ankylosauridae). These studies however, only utilized the skull, whereas many of the distinctive features of the family Polacanthidae are in the postcranial skeleton.

Below is a reproduced phylogenetic analysis from Soto-Acuña et al. (2021):

See also

 Timeline of ankylosaur research

References
 Carpenter, K., Miles, C. and Cloward, K. (1998). "Skull of a Jurassic ankylosaur (Dinosauria)." Nature 393: 782–783.
 Carpenter, K. (ed.) The Armored Dinosaurs. pp. 454–483. Indiana University Press, Bloomington.
 Vickaryous, Maryanska, and Weishampel (2004). "Ankylosauria". in The Dinosauria (2nd edition), Weishampel, D. B., Dodson, P., and Osmólska, H., editors. University of California Press.
 Killbourne, B. and Carpenter, K. (2005). "Redescription of Gargoyleosaurus parkpinorum, a polacanthid ankylosaur from the Upper Jurassic of Albany County, Wyoming". Neues Jahrbuch für Geologie und Paläontologie, 237, 111–160.

External links
 Gargoyleosaurus  from the Natural History Museum

Nodosaurids
Late Jurassic dinosaurs of North America
Dinosaurs of the Morrison Formation
Fossil taxa described in 1998
Taxa named by Kenneth Carpenter
Paleontology in Wyoming
Ornithischian genera